Brookview may refer to:

Brookview, Maryland
Brookview, New Jersey
Brookview, New York